Evaluation is a quarterly peer-reviewed academic journal that covers in the field of evaluation. The editor-in-chief is Eliot Stern (Tavistock Institute). It was established in 1995 and is currently published by SAGE Publications in association with the Tavistock Institute.

Abstracting and indexing 
Evaluation is abstracted and indexed in:
 Academic Search Premier
 British Education Index
 Current Contents/Social and Behavioral Sciences
 Educational Research Abstracts Online
 Human Resources Abstracts
 SciVal
 Scopus

External links 
 

SAGE Publishing academic journals
English-language journals
Multidisciplinary social science journals
Quarterly journals
Publications established in 1995